Rhizogonium is a genus of mosses belonging to the family Rhizogoniaceae.

The genus has almost cosmopolitan distribution.

Species:

Rhizogonium alpestre 
Rhizogonium bifarium 
Rhizogonium distichum 
Rhizogonium dozyanum 
Rhizogonium graeffeanum 
Rhizogonium hattorii 
Rhizogonium hookeri 
Rhizogonium lamii 
Rhizogonium latifolium 
Rhizogonium lindigii 
Rhizogonium longiflorum 
Rhizogonium mauritianum 
Rhizogonium medium 
Rhizogonium menziesii 
Rhizogonium microphyllum 
Rhizogonium mikawaense 
Rhizogonium mnioides 
Rhizogonium novae-hollandiae 
Rhizogonium paramattense 
Rhizogonium pellucidum 
Rhizogonium pennatum 
Rhizogonium piliferum 
Rhizogonium pungens 
Rhizogonium radiatum 
Rhizogonium setosum 
Rhizogonium spiniforme 
Rhizogonium spininervium 
Rhizogonium subbasilare 
Rhizogonium undulatum 
Rhizogonium vallis-gratiae 
Rhizogonium venustum

References

Rhizogoniales
Moss genera